Lester J. Harrison (August 20, 1904 – December 23, 1997) was an American professional basketball player, coach, and team owner and is a member of the Naismith Memorial Basketball Hall of Fame.

Career
Upon his graduation from East High School in Rochester, New York, in 1923, Harrison began playing, coaching, and organizing semi-professional basketball, working for the Rochester Seagrams and later the Rochester Ebers.

In 1945, with his brother Joseph (Jack), Harrison founded his own semi-pro team, the Rochester Pros; in 1946, the franchise changed its name to Royals and began play in the National Basketball League (NBL).  Harrison oversaw the NBL iteration of his team for three years, with head coach Eddie Malanowicz leading the Royals to three straight NBL finals (of which the team won one, over the Sheboygan Red Skins in 1946) and amassing a record of 99 wins and 43 losses.  In 1946, Harrison, as team owner, signed Long Island University standout Dolly King; King became the first African-American to have played in the league since 1943 and the first to see substantial playing time for his team.

After the 1947–48 season, Harrison moved his team to the Basketball Association of America (BAA), and, after his team spent one year in the BAA, served on the committee that brokered the merger of the BAA and NBL and produced the National Basketball Association (NBA).  Harrison coached the Royals through the 1954–55 season and would retire having led his team to five NBA divisional titles and the 1951 NBA championship when the Royals defeated the New York Knicks in seven games.  He remained owner of the Royals for three more years, relocating the team to Cincinnati, Ohio prior to the 1957 season and selling in 1958.
Harrison coached many Naismith Basketball Hall of Famers, including Bob Davies, Red Holzman, Bobby Wanzer, Al Cervi, Arnie Risen, Pop Gates and Alex Hannum. He also coached Pro Football Hall of Fame quarterback Otto Graham, Chuck "The Rifleman" Connors and Del Rice, an MLB player and the manager of the California Angels in 1972.

Honors
In view of his having been a member of the boards of directors of the NBL, BAA, and NBA, having helped broker the merger of the NBL and BAA, and having been a proponent of the introduction of the 24-second shot clock, Harrison was inducted into the Naismith Memorial Basketball Hall of Fame as a contributor in 1980. His induction class included Jerry West, Oscar Robertson, Jerry Lucas, Dallas Shirley and Everett Shelton. In 1990, he was inducted into the International Jewish Sports Hall of Fame.

The basketball court at the Blue Cross Arena in Rochester is named in his honor and plays host to the Section V high school basketball tournament each year. It also serves as home court for the Rochester Razorsharks of the Premier Basketball League.

References

External links 
 
 Basketball-Reference.com: Les Harrison

1904 births
1997 deaths
American men's basketball coaches
Basketball coaches from New York (state)
Jewish men's basketball players
Naismith Memorial Basketball Hall of Fame inductees
National Basketball Association championship-winning head coaches
National Basketball League (United States) owners
Rochester Royals head coaches
Sportspeople from Rochester, New York